Doublet Peak is the sixth-highest peak (tied with Turret Peak) in the U.S. state of Wyoming and the fifth-highest in the Wind River Range. The summit is immediately south of Dinwoody Glacier and just west of Mount Warren.

Hazards

Encountering bears is a concern in the Wind River Range. There are other concerns as well, including bugs, wildfires, adverse snow conditions and nighttime cold temperatures.

Importantly, there have been notable incidents, including accidental deaths, due to falls from steep cliffs (a misstep could be fatal in this class 4/5 terrain) and due to falling rocks, over the years, including 1993, 2007 (involving an experienced NOLS leader), 2015 and 2018. Other incidents include a seriously injured backpacker being airlifted near SquareTop Mountain in 2005, and a fatal hiker incident (from an apparent accidental fall) in 2006 that involved state search and rescue. The U.S. Forest Service does not offer updated aggregated records on the official number of fatalities in the Wind River Range.

References

External links
 General Information on the Wind River Range 
 Climbing the Wind River Range (more)
 Glaciers in the Wind River Range
 Shoshone National Forest Federal website
 Continental Divide Trail information

Bridger–Teton National Forest
Greater Yellowstone Ecosystem
Mountain ranges of Wyoming
Mountains of Sublette County, Wyoming
Mountains of Wyoming
Ranges of the Rocky Mountains
Shoshone National Forest